The Great Dayton Flood of 1913 resulted from flooding by the Great Miami River reaching Dayton, Ohio, and the surrounding area, causing the greatest natural disaster in Ohio history. In response, the General Assembly passed the Vonderheide Act to enable the formation of conservancy districts. The Miami Conservancy District, which included Dayton and the surrounding area, became one of the first major flood control districts in Ohio and the United States.

The Dayton flood of March 1913 was caused by a series of severe winter rainstorms that hit the Midwest in late March. Within three days,  of rain fell throughout the Great Miami River watershed on already saturated soil, resulting in more than 90 percent runoff. The river and its tributaries overflowed. This flood is still the flood of record for the Great Miami River watershed. The volume of water that passed through the river channel during this storm equaled the monthly flow over Niagara Falls.

Other Ohio cities also had flooding from these storms but none as extensive as the cities of Dayton, Piqua, Troy, and Hamilton, along the Great Miami River.

Background conditions
Dayton was founded along the Great Miami River at the convergence of its three tributaries: the Stillwater River, the Mad River, and Wolf Creek. The city's central business district developed within  of the confluence of these waterways. When Israel Ludlow laid out Dayton in 1795, the local Indigenous Peoples warned him about the recurring flooding .

Prior to the 1913 flood, the Dayton area had suffered major floods nearly every other decade, with major water flows in 1805, 1828, 1847, 1866, and 1898. Most of downtown Dayton was built in the Great Miami River's natural flood plain, which seemed advantageous in the early years when cities depended on rivers for transportation needs.

The storms that caused the flood at Dayton continued over several days, and affected an area across all or parts of more than a dozen states, most notably states in the Midwest and along the Mississippi River. Heavy rain and snow saturated the soil and produced widespread flooding, known as the Great Flood of 1913, across Indiana, Ohio, Kentucky, New York, and Pennsylvania.

Timeline

The following events took place in Dayton between March 21 and March 26, 1913.

Friday, March 21, 1913

Saturday, March 22, 1913

The area experiences a sunny day until the second storm arrives, dropping temperatures to the 20s, which causes the ground to briefly freeze on the surface during the morning, and thaw by late afternoon.

Sunday, March 23, 1913 (Easter Sunday)

The third storm brings rain to the entire Ohio River valley. The soil was saturated and nearly all the rain becomes runoff, flowing into the Great Miami River and its tributaries.

Monday, March 24, 1913

Tuesday, March 25, 1913

Midnight—The Dayton police are warned that the Herman Street levee was weakening, and they start the warning sirens and alarms.
6:00 am—Water overflowing the levees begins to stream along the city streets.
8:00 am—Levees on the south side of the downtown business district fail, and flooding begins downtown.
Water levels continue to rise throughout the day.

Wednesday, March 26, 1913

Later that morning, a gas explosion occurs downtown, near the intersection of 5th Street and Wilkinson. The explosion starts a fire that destroys most of a city block. The open gas lines results in several fires throughout the city. The fire department is unable to reach the fires due to flooding, and many additional buildings are lost.

Relief efforts
Ohio governor James M. Cox sent the Ohio National Guard to protect property and life and to support the city's recovery efforts. The Guard was not able to reach the city for several days because of the high water conditions throughout the state. They built refugee camps, sheltering people in tents who had been permanently or temporarily displaced from their homes.

Initial access was provided by the Dayton, Lebanon and Cincinnati Railroad and Terminal Company, the only line not affected by the flood.

Governor Cox called on the state legislature to appropriate $250,000 ($ in  dollars) for emergency aid and declared a 10-day bank holiday. When newly elected President Woodrow Wilson sent telegrams to the governors of Ohio and Indiana asking how the federal government might help, Cox replied with a request for tents, rations, supplies, and physicians. Governor Cox sent a telegram to the American Red Cross headquarters in Washington D.C. requesting their assistance in Dayton and surrounding communities. Its agents and nurses focused their efforts in 112 of Ohio's hardest-hit communities, which included Dayton and others located primarily along Ohio's major rivers.

Some of the Dayton flood victims made their way to National Cash Register's factory and headquarters, where John H. Patterson, the company's president, and his factory workers assisted flood victims and relief workers. NCR employees built nearly 300 flat-bottomed rescue boats. Patterson organized rescue teams to save the thousands of people stranded on roofs and the upper stories of buildings. He turned the NCR factory on Stewart Street into an emergency shelter, providing food and lodging. He organized local doctors and nurses to provide medical care. NCR facilities served as the Dayton headquarters for the American Red Cross and Ohio National Guard relief and rescue efforts and provided food and shelter, a hospital and medical personnel, and a makeshift morgue. The company's grounds became a temporary campground for the city's homeless. Patterson also provided news reporters and photographers with food and lodging and access to equipment and communications to file their stories. When the presses of the Dayton Daily News became inoperable due to the floodwaters, the newspaper used NCR's in-house printing press, providing Dayton and NCR with press coverage on AP and UPI newswires.

Casualties and property damage
As the water receded, damages were assessed in the Dayton area:
 More than 360 people died.
 Nearly 65,000 people were displaced.
 Approximately 20,000 homes were destroyed.
 Buildings were moved off their foundations, and debris in the moving water damaged other structures.
 Property damage to homes, businesses, factories, and railroads were estimated at more than $100 million in 1913 dollars ($ in  dollars).
 Nearly 1,400 horses and 2,000 other domestic animals died.

Cleanup and rebuilding efforts took approximately one year to repair the flood damage. The economic impacts of the flood took most of a decade to recover. Destruction from the flood is also responsible for the dearth of old and historical buildings in the urban core of Dayton. Its center city resembles that of newer cities established in the western United States.

One of the victims was former Marquette University president Joseph F. Rigge.

Flood control
The people of the Dayton area were determined to prevent another flood disaster of the same magnitude. Led by Patterson's vision for a managed watershed district, on March 27, 1913, Governor Cox appointed people to the Dayton Citizens Relief Commission. In May, the commission conducted a 10-day fundraiser, which collected more than $2 million ($ in  dollars) to fund the flood control effort. The commission hired hydrological engineer Arthur E. Morgan and his Morgan Engineering Company from Tennessee to design an extensive plan based on levees and dams to protect Dayton from future floods.
 Morgan later worked on flood plain projects in Pueblo, Colorado, and the Tennessee Valley Authority.

Morgan hired nearly 50 engineers to analyze the Miami Valley watershed and precipitation patterns and to determine the flood volume. They analyzed European flood data for information about general flooding patterns. Based on this analysis, Morgan presented eight different flood control plans to the City of Dayton officials in October 1913. The city selected a plan based on the flood control system in the Loire Valley in France. It consisted of five earthen dams and modifications to the river channel through Dayton. The dams would have conduits to release a limited amount of water, and a wider river channel would use larger levees supported by a series of training levees. Flood storage areas behind the dams would be used as farmland between floods. Morgan's goal was to develop a flood plan that would handle 140 percent of the water from the 1913 flood. The analysis had determined the river channel boundaries for the expected 1,000-year major floods, and all businesses located in that area were to be relocated.

With the support of Governor Cox, Dayton attorney John McMahon worked on drafting the Vonderheide Act, Ohio's conservancy law, in 1914. The Act allowed local governments to define conservancy districts for flood control. Controversial elements of the Act gave local governments the right to raise funds for the civil engineering efforts through taxes and granted eminent domain to support the purchase or condemnation of the necessary lands for dams, basins, and flood plains. On March 17, 1914, the governor signed the Ohio Conservancy Act, which allowed for the establishment of conservancy districts with the authority to implement flood control projects. The Act became the model for other states, such as Indiana, New Mexico, and Colorado. Ohio's Upper Scioto Conservancy District was the first to form in February 1915. The Miami Conservancy District, which includes Dayton and surrounding communities, was the second, formed in June 1915.

Morgan was appointed as the Miami Conservancy District's first chief engineer. The constitutionality of the Act was challenged in Orr v. Allen, a lawsuit brought by a landowner affected by the exercise of eminent domain, and attempts were made to amend it through the Garver-Quinlisk bills. Legal battles continued from 1915 to 1919 and reached the U.S. Supreme Court, which upheld the law.

Miami Conservancy District's flood project
The Miami Conservancy District began construction of its flood control system in 1918. Since 1922, when the project was completed at a cost in excess of $32 million, it has prevented Dayton from any flood as severe as that of 1913. Since its completion, the Miami Conservancy District has protected the Dayton area from flooding more than 1,500 times. Ongoing expenses for maintaining the district comes from property tax assessments collected annually from all property holders in the district. Properties closer to the river channel and the natural flood plain pay more than properties further away.

Osborn, Ohio
The small village of Osborn, Ohio, which had little damage from the flood, was affected by the flood's aftermath. The village lay in the area designated to become part of the Huffman flood plain. The mainline tracks of the Erie Railroad, the New York Central Railroad, and the Ohio Electric Railway all ran through Osborn. As a result of establishing the conservancy area, the rail lines were moved several miles south out of the floodplain to run through Fairfield, Ohio.

The citizens of Osborn decided to move their homes instead of abandoning them. Nearly 400 homes were moved three miles (5 km) to new foundations along Hebble Creek next to Fairfield. Some years later, the two towns merged to create Fairborn, Ohio, with the name selected to reflect the merging of the two villages.

Other losses
Orville and Wilbur Wright, who made their home in Dayton, had flown for the first time a decade earlier. They were developing aviation in their workshop and the area around Huffman Prairie adjacent to the planned Huffman Dam. They had meticulously documented the flight efforts by using a camera and had an extensive collection of photographic plates. The flood caused water damage in their workshop, creating cracks and blemishes on these photographic plates. Prints made from the plates prior to the flood were better quality than the prints made after the flood. But they made few prints from the glass negatives before 1913 because the Wrights kept evidence of their pioneering work a secret from the public. Those images lost to flood damage were irreplaceable.

By 1913, the Miami and Erie Canal was still intact, but barely used. To alleviate flooding conditions, local government leaders used dynamite to remove locks in the canal to allow the water to flow unimpeded. Sections of canal were also inundated and destroyed by nearby river flooding. Since they were no longer economically viable, Ohio's canals were simply abandoned except for limited sections that supplied water to industry.

See also
1913 Omaha Easter Sunday tornado
Disaster Books – The Great Dayton Flood
Great Flood of 1913

References

Primary sources
 1913 Flood Collection (MS-016). Dayton Metro Library, Dayton, Ohio. 
 1913 Dayton Flood Collection. University of Dayton University Archives and Special Collections, Dayton, Ohio. 
 Original film footage of 1913 Flood, part of the Glenn R. Walters Collection. University of Dayton University Archives and Special Collections, Dayton, Ohio.

External links
 Dayton and the 1913 Flood
 Miami Conservancy District 1913 Flood History
 Ohio History Central:Vonderheide Act
 FindLaw: Orr v. Allen
 The 1913 Flood (Archived version of defunct 1913flood.com website)

History of Ohio
Montgomery County, Ohio
Greene County, Ohio
Miami County, Ohio
Clark County, Ohio
Floods in the United States
Natural disasters in Ohio
1913 floods in the United States
History of Dayton, Ohio
NCR Corporation
1913 in Ohio
March 1913 events in the United States
1913 natural disasters in the United States